Michele Desubleo (1601–1676), also called Michele Fiammingo (Flemish) or Michele di Giovanni de Sobleau, was a Flemish painter active in Central and North Italy during the Baroque era.

Biography
Born in Maubeuge in 1601, Desubleo probably learned his trade in Flanders, although there is no proof he was trained in the workshop of Abraham Janssens together with his stepbrother Nicolas Régnier. With the latter he moved to Rome, where he is recorded in 1624 and 1625. By the beginning of the 1630s, he was working in Bologna, in the busy workshop of Guido Reni, who was a crucial influence on him and on other artists of his age or slightly younger, including Simone Cantarini and Jean Boulanger. Starting 1654, he worked for a decade in the Veneto region. After 1665, there is evidence of his presence in Parma, where the significant paintings he left include a large altarpiece with the Madonna and Saints for the cathedral and a canvas on the secular subject of Sacred Love Triumphing over Profane Love. It was in Parma that he died in 1676.

References
 Stefania Girometti, "Oltre Roma, oltre Guido. Michele Desubleo tra Bologna e Venezia", Guido Reni alla Galleria Borghese. Dopo la mostra gli studi, ed. by Francesca Cappelletti / Raffaella Morselli, Genova 2022, p.  107-117.
 Stefania Girometti, In Italien Karriere machen. Der flämische Maler Michele Desubleo zwischen Rom, Bologna und Venedig (ca. 1624–1664), Heidelberg: arthistoricum 2022, https://doi.org/10.11588/arthistoricum.922 [open access]
 Stefania Girometti, "'Guido Reni Inventor'? Zur Entstehung kreativen Potenzials in Renis Bologneser Werkstatt", Geteilte Arbeit. Praktiken künstlerischer Kooperation‚ ed. by Magdalena Bushart / Henrike Haug, Cologne 2020, p. 97-112.
 Diego Cauzzi / Stefania Girometti / Claudio Seccaroni, "Venere piange la morte di Adone. Sguardi incrociati tra Michele Desubleo e Nicolas Régnier", Bollettino ICR, N.S. 33, 2016 [2018], p. 29-39.
 Stefania Girometti, "Michele Desubleo, Repos pendant la fuite en Egypte (copie anonyme dʼaprès)", Le Musée sort de sa réserve. Une collection redécouverte, exhibition catalogue Musée de Soissons (26 November 2016 – 16 April 2017), ed. by Sophie Laroche, Soissons 2016, p. 18-20.
 Domenico Sedini, Michele Desubleo, online catalogue Artgate by Fondazione Cariplo, 2010, CC BY-SA.
 Alberto Cottino, Michele Desubleo, Cremona 2001.
 Lucia Peruzzi, "Per Michele Desubleo, fiammingo", Paragone. Arte, 37, 1986, p. 85-92.

Other projects

1601 births
1676 deaths
17th-century Italian painters
Italian male painters
Flemish Baroque painters